Desrances is a 2019 Burkinabé drama thriller film directed by Apolline Traoré and produced by Denis Cougnaud. It stars Jimmy Jean-Louis and Jemima Naomi Nemlin with Evelyne Ily and Mike Danon in supporting roles. The film was shot at Haiti.

The film set during the 2010-11 post-election violence in Ivory Coast and centered around the courage of a 12-year-old girl. The film premiered at the Panafrican Film and Television Festival of Ouagadougou (Fespaco). The film was also nominated for the Best Actor In Leading Role at Africa Movie Academy Awards.

Cast 
 Jimmy Jean-Louis as Francis Desrances 
 Jemima Naomi Nemlin as Haila 
 Evelyne Ily
 Mike Danon
 Narcisse Afeti
 Tiekoumba Dosso
 Missa Ndri
 Delphine Ouattara
 Bienvenue Neba
 Toty Djah

Awards and nominations

References

External links 
 

Burkinabé drama films
2019 films
2019 drama films